Pachyrhabda is a genus of moths in the family Stathmopodidae.

Species

Pachyrhabda acroscia Turner, 1941 (from Australia)
Pachyrhabda adela Turner, 1923 (from Australia)
Pachyrhabda amianta  Meyrick, 1927 (from Samoa)
Pachyrhabda antinoma Meyrick, 1910 (from Australia & New Zealand)
Pachyrhabda argyritis Turner, 1941 (from Australia)
Pachyrhabda bacterias  Meyrick, 1913 (from Australia & Sri Lanka)
Pachyrhabda campylosticha Turner, 1941 (from Australia)
Pachyrhabda capnoscia Turner, 1923 (from Australia)
Pachyrhabda citrinacma Meyrick, 1936 (from Taiwan)
Pachyrhabda dicastis  (Meyrick, 1905) (from India & Sri Lanka)
Pachyrhabda epichlora  (Meyrick, 1889) from New Zealand
Pachyrhabda euphanopis  Meyrick, 1927 (from New Hebrides)
Pachyrhabda fissa Meyrick, 1921 (from Java)
Pachyrhabda hygrophaes Turner, 1923 (from Australia)
Pachyrhabda inanis  Meyrick, 1936 (from Java)
Pachyrhabda liriopis Turner, 1941 (from Australia)
Pachyrhabda phanta  Bradley, 1957 (from Rennel island)
Pachyrhabda punctifera Turner, 1941 (from Australia)
Pachyrhabda steropodes Meyrick, 1897 (from Australia)
Pachyrhabda suspecta  Meyrick, 1921 (from Java)
Pachyrhabda tridora Meyrick, 1911 (from the Seychelles)
Pachyrhabda triplecta Meyrick, 1913 (from South Africa)
Pachyrhabda tumida  Meyrick, 1913 (from Sri Lanka)
Pachyrhabda unctoria Meyrick, 1911 (from South Africa)
Pachyrhabda viscosa  Meyrick, 1913 (from India)
Pachyrhabda xanthoscia Turner, 1923 (from Australia)

References

Meyrick, 1897 . Proc. Linn. Soc. N.S.W. 22 : 299, 312
Markku Savela's ftp.funet.fi

Stathmopodidae
Moth genera
Taxa named by Edward Meyrick